This is a list of Bulgarian football transfers for the 2022 summer transfer window. Only transfers involving a team from the two professional leagues, First League and Second League are listed.

First League

Arda

In:

Out:

Beroe

In:

Out:

Botev Plovdiv

In:

Out:

Botev Vratsa

In:

 

Out:

Cherno More

In:

Out:

CSKA Sofia

In:

Out:

CSKA 1948

In:

Out:

Hebar

In:

Out:

Levski Sofia

In:

Out:

Lokomotiv Plovdiv

In:

Out:

Lokomotiv Sofia

In:

Out:

Ludogorets

In:

Out:

Pirin Blagoevgrad

In:

Out:

Septemvri Sofia

In:

Out:

Slavia Sofia

In:

Out:

Spartak Varna

In:

Out:

Second League

Belasitsa

In:

Out:

Botev Plovdiv II

In:

Out:

CSKA 1948 II

In:

Out:

Dobrudzha

In:

Out:

Dunav Ruse

In:

Out:

Etar

In:

Out:

Krumovgrad

In:

Out:

Litex Lovech

In:

Out:

Ludogorets II

In:

Out:

Maritsa

In:

Out:

Minyor Pernik

In:

Out:

Montana

In:

Out:

Sozopol

In:

Out:

Spartak Pleven

In:

Out:

Sportist Svoge

In:

Out:

Strumska Slava

In:

Out:

Vitosha Bistritsa

In:

Out:

Yantra

In:

Out:

References

2022 in Bulgarian sport
Football in Bulgaria
Bulgaria
Summer 2022